Athletes from Germany have taken part in most of the Olympic Games since the first modern Games in 1896. Germany has hosted three Olympic Games, in 1936 both the Winter and Summer Games, and the 1972 Summer Olympics. In addition, Germany had been selected to host the 1916 Summer Olympics as well as the 1940 Winter Olympics, both of which had to be cancelled due to World Wars. After these wars, Germans were banned from participating in 1920, 1924 and 1948. While the  country was divided, each of the two German states boycotted one of the Summer Games: in 1980 West Germany was one of 66 nations which did not go to Moscow in protest at the Soviet invasion of Afghanistan and in 1984 East Germany joined the Soviet Union (and several others) in the boycott of the Summer Games in Los Angeles.

The IOC currently splits German results among four codes, even though only the German Democratic Republic (GDR) from 1968 to 1988 had sent a separate team to compete against the team of the German NOC that represented Germany (GER) since 1896.

German post-WW2 division until 1990 
After German organisations had been dissolved by the Allies in 1947, in 1950 the IOC recognized the reorganized Nationales Olympisches Komitee für Deutschland for all of Germany, based in (West) Germany.

Due to the Cold War, an East German state (German Democratic Republic) was created in October 1949, and a separate National Olympic Committee (NOC) for East Germany was established in 1951. It was not immediately recognized by the IOC, which until 1965 required that athletes of the NOC of East Germany join the German team represented by the West Germany-based NOC of Germany. This team, which competed together from 1956 to 1964, is nowadays called the United Team of Germany (EUA, "Equipe Unifiée Allemande"), but was Germany (GER) then. As a result of the Germany being divided, from 1968 to 1990 two independent teams competed in each of the Games; the original designations were GER for the Federal Republic of Germany (West Germany) and GDR for the German Democratic Republic (East Germany). In 1980 the West German code was changed to FRG (which is currently also applied by the IOC in retrospect). After the GDR ceased to exist in 1990 and its states joined the Federal Republic of Germany, Germany once again was represented by a single team, designated GER.

Additionally, in the early 1950s the French-occupied Saar had its own NOC and competed at the 1952 Summer Olympics before joining the German Olympic team in 1956 and the (West) German state by 1957.

Overview of Olympic participation

Timeline of participation

Germany at the Summer Olympics

Germany at the Winter Olympics

Medals by Summer Sport 
*This table does not include two medals – one gold and one silver – awarded in the figure skating events at the 1908 Summer Olympics.

Medals by Winter Sport 
*This table includes two medals – one gold and one silver – awarded in the figure skating events at the 1908 Summer Olympics.

Combined medals of all German NOCs
Germany has competed at the Olympics under five different designations, including as two separate teams at several Games. Sources vary in how they present the medals won by these teams. The table below shows sourced combinations of these teams, when applied to the main table. Saar competed independently in the Summer Olympic games in 1952, but failed to win any medals. Due to most lists only listing medal counts, it's possible but not certain Saar was included as part of Germany in their calculations.

Medal counts:
status after the 2022 Olympics, as of February 20, 2022

Hosted Games 
For the 1972 Summer Olympics in Munich, West Germany, see West Germany at the Olympics.

Unsuccessful bids

See also
 List of flag bearers for Germany at the Olympics
 :Category:Olympic competitors for Germany
 Germany at the Paralympics

References

External links
 
 
 

 
Sport in Germany